John Conran (born 1957 in Rathnure, County Wexford, Ireland) is an Irish former hurling manager and player. He played hurling for his local club Rathnure and at senior level for the Wexford county team from 1976 until 1991. Conran served as manager of Wexford from 2002 until 2004.

References

1958 births
Living people
Hurling managers
Hurling selectors
Rathnure hurlers
Wexford inter-county hurlers